Košarkaški klub Furnir, commonly referred to as KK Furnir or simply Furnir, is a men's professional basketball club based in Dubrava, Zagreb, Croatia.

The club was founded on 22 April 1976. It advanced into the first Croatian basketball league between 1986 and 1989, which was at the time a second-tier league under the Yugoslav Basketball League.
In 1993 they advanced to the A-1 Liga, the first-tier league of the Republic of Croatia, under the name Benston, when their primary sponsor was the tobacco factory Tvornica Duhana Zagreb. In 1996, they entered a European competition for the first time.

At the start of the 2000–01 season, they changed their name to KK Dona, again for sponsorship reasons. In the 2005–06 season they were relegated from the A-1 to the A-2 Liga but returned the following season.

References

External links
Official website 

Dubrava
Sports teams in Zagreb
Basketball teams in Yugoslavia